Tottenham Hotspur Football Club became the first British club to win a major European competition, with the European Cup Winners' Cup in 1963. In 1972, they won the inaugural UEFA Cup and won the competition again in 1984. The team regularly qualified for European football in the 2010s, and were runners-up in the 2018–19 UEFA Champions League. Defender Steve Perryman is the club's most decorated player; winning two UEFA Cup titles. Striker Harry Kane holds the record for most goals with 45, and most appearances with 76. In September 2021, Kane became the first player to score a hat-trick in each of the Champions League, Europa League, and Europa Conference League.

Up until 2016, White Hart Lane served as the club's home venue for European home matches, which was temporarily replaced with Wembley Stadium the following season. Their first home match of the 2016–17 UEFA Champions League group stage saw the club's highest ever record attendance of 85,011 for a European home match against Monaco. As of 2019, home games are played at the Tottenham Hotspur Stadium.

Summary

By competition

Source: UEFA.com, Last updated on 8 March 2023. Pld = Matches played; W = Matches won; D = Matches drawn; L = Matches lost; GF = Goals for; GA = Goals against. Defunct competitions indicated in italics.

By home or away

Last updated: 8 March 2023
1 Includes two 1995 Intertoto Cup matches against Lucerne and Östers where Tottenham played as hosts away from their home stadium, at The Goldstone Ground. They lost both matches and Tottenham was banned from UEFA European competitions for the following season, after fielding under-strength sides.

2 Tottenham’s final group stage match at home in the 2021–22 UEFA Europa Conference League against Rennes did not take place due to numerous positive COVID-19 tests in the Tottenham Hotspur squad. The UEFA Appeals Body declined Tottenham’s request to rearrange the game before the 31 December deadline, which meant they had forfeited the game, awarding a 3–0 win for Rennes.

By opponent
Table correct as of match played 8 March 2023.

European finals
Spurs' score listed first

List of matches

Last updated: 8 March 2023Note: Tottenham score always listed first.

References

External links
Tottenham Hotspur - Full Record of European Cup Ties

Europe
Tottenham Hotspur